Saidullo Abdullaev   (born March 17, 1965) is the Chairman of the Board of Directors of “Management Development Institute of Singapore in Tashkent, and at the same time he is the General Director of “Uzbekistan Banking Association”. Meanwhile, Abdullaev Saidullo Parxodbekovich is a Deputy Chairman of International Coordination Council of Banking Associations in the CIS, and Central and Eastern Europe.

Biography 
Abdullaev Saidullo Parxodbekovich was born in Namangan city. His nationality is Uzbek. In 1982 he finished the secondary school number 20 in his birthplace. Right after finishing his school he started working, and in the same year of 1982 he was the secretary in Namangan city court, where he worked only for one year, till the 1983. In that year he went to the army, and served for the military forces in “Kalinin” city, between 1983 and 1985. After the army, he was able to enter to the “Kalinin State University” which is now located in Russian Federation and graduated from the university in 1991 with the economist specialism. After graduation he came back to Uzbekistan and worked at Namangan commission between 1991 and 1992. Between 1992 and 1993 he was promoted in his career level, and worked as the chief specialist at the Namangan statistics center. Between 1993 and 1994 he worked in Namangan National Bank's economy department as the vice manager. Between 1994 and 1997 he worked as the manager of the “Galla bank” branch in Namangan. During his work time, he entered to the “Bank-Finance Academy of Uzbekistan, and after graduation in 1997 he obtained the master’s degree on economy field. Right after his successful studies he moved to Tashkent city, where he is currently working. From 1997 he has been working in different positions at the “Central Bank of Uzbekistan", which are:
1997-1998 Director of valuable security department
1998-1999 Director of analysis of economic information department
1999-2000 Director of economic analysis department
2000-2002 Director of licensing and controlling the commercial banks department
2002 – Vice director of Uzbekistan Banking Association
2005 General Director of Uzbekistan Banking Association
Saidullo Abdullaev Parxodbekovich is married and he has 3 children.

See also

Politics of Uzbekistan

Links 
Uzbek government
Details of the Uzbek Banking Association
Official web site of Uzbekistan Banking association
Official web site of MDIST

References

See also 
Uzbekistan
Islam Karimov
Uzbekistan Banking Association
Management Development Institute of Singapore in Tashkent

Uzbekistani businesspeople
People from Namangan Region
1965 births
Living people